Carlos Rangel (17 September 1929 – 15 January 1988) was a Venezuelan liberal writer, journalist and diplomat.

Background 
Carlos Enrique Rangel Guevara was born in Caracas on 17 September 1929. His parents were José Antonio Rangel Báez and Magdalena Guevara Hermoso. He went to primary school and high school in the city of Caracas, but all his higher education was done in the United States and Europe. He graduated as Bachelor of Arts at Bard College and earned the Certificat d'Etudes at the Sorbonne in Paris. Then he did a master's degree at New York University. Thanks to his mastering of English and French he received formal certification as a translator. He served as an instructor at New York University in 1958 and later on, between 1961 and 1963, he took up the Chair of Opinion Journalism at the Central University of Venezuela (UCV).

Career
Rangel served as First Secretary of the Embassy of Venezuela in Brussels in 1959. He returned to the field of international relations almost twenty years later to assume the position of Chief Ambassador of Venezuela's mission to the Dominican Republic for the inauguration of President Joaquín Balaguer.

In 1960 he began his journalistic activity, which he continuously kept practicing for the next ten years with positions as Director of "Momento" magazine and as moderator of TV shows like "Frente a la Prensa" (Facing the Press). During his twenty years in television he discussed his ideas on many topics related to Venezuelan and international news events with leading national and foreign personalities.

Rangel was also a renowned writer. In 1977 he published "The Latin Americans: Their Love-Hate Relationship with the United States", originally published as "Del buen Salvaje al Buen Revolucionario - Mitos y Realidades De América Latina" (From the Noble Savage to the Noble Revolutionary - Myths and Realities of Latin America) (1976) and then "Third World Ideology and Western Reality: Manufacturing Political Myth" (1986), which appeared first as "El tercermundismo" (1982). Both books, prefaced by the French intellectual Jean-François Revel, were translated into several languages, including French, Portuguese, Italian and German.

He was also a regular columnist for the national and international press. Some of his articles were published posthumously (1988) in a book titled "Marx y los socialismos reales y otros ensayos" (Marx and real socialism and other essays).

Personal life and death
Carlos Rangel and his first wife, Barbara Barling, had four children: Antonio Enrique, Carlos José, Magdalena Teresa and Diana Cristina. Along with his second wife, Sofía Ímber, he began hosting the TV show "Buenos días", which Venevisión transmitted on channel 4 during the morning marathon "Buenos Días Venezuela", which competed with "Lo de Hoy" (Today) on RCTV.

Rangel died by suicide on 15 January 1988, aged 58.

References

English bibliography 
 Rangel, Carlos (1977). The Latin Americans : their love-hate relationship with the United States. New York: Harcourt Brace Jovanovich.
 Rangel, Carlos (1986). Third world ideology and Western reality : manufacturing political myth. New Brunswick: Transaction Books.

Spanish bibliography 
 Rangel, Carlos (1976). Del buen salvaje al buen revolucionario : mitos y realidades de América Latina. Caracas: Monte Avila Editores.
 Rangel, Carlos (1982). El tercermundismo. Caracas: Monte Avila Editores.
 Rangel, Carlos (1988). Marx y los socialismos reales y otros ensayos. Caracas: Monte Avila Editores.

External links 
Sala Virtual de Investigación Sofía Ímber/Carlos Rangel
RANGEL (Redes para la Acción de Nuevos Grupos de Estudios Latinoamericanos)
Página dedicada a Carlos Rangel

1929 births
1988 deaths
1988 suicides
20th-century Venezuelan writers
20th-century journalists
Bard College alumni
Academic staff of the Central University of Venezuela
Liberalism in Venezuela
New York University alumni
New York University faculty
Suicides by firearm in Venezuela
Venezuelan diplomats
Venezuelan expatriates in France
Venezuelan expatriates in the United States
Venezuelan journalists
Venezuelan male writers
University of Paris alumni
Writers from Caracas